"Nevada" is a song by American rapper YoungBoy Never Broke Again. It was released on July 7, 2021, as the third single from his third studio album Sincerely, Kentrell. The song was produced by TnTXD and Vadebeatz.

Composition
The song finds YoungBoy melodically rapping over an electric guitar instrumental. It has been called an "apparent ode to his significant other": "Don't know who I want, you the one I want / Never said I don't, that's that money talk / Drunker than a skunk, it go down in the room / Choppas in the trunk, baby, this that slime tone".

Charts

Certifications

References

2021 singles
2021 songs
Atlantic Records singles
Songs written by YoungBoy Never Broke Again
YoungBoy Never Broke Again songs